Mathieu Christian Moreau (born 22 February 1983) is a French former footballer who played as a goalkeeper.

Football career

Internazionale
Mathieu Moreau started his career at French most famous youth academy at Nantes. In summer 2001 he joined Internazionale. He won Campionato Nazionale Primavera in summer 2002 as Alex Cordaz's backup.

In summer 2003, he was farmed to Spezia (Serie C1) along with Mattia Altobelli.

A year later, he was loaned to Ternana (Serie B) along with Fabrizio Biava.

Lucchese
In summer 2005, he was loaned again, this time to Lucchese (Serie C1) along with Fabrizio Biava. He played as second choice behind Alex Brunner.

In summer 2006, Lucchese bought half of the player's registration rights, for a peppercorn fee of €500 and a year later bought all the registration rights. But along with Paolo Castelli, also was owned by Inter, failed to play regularly, work behind Brunner and later Massimo Gazzoli.

Varese
In summer 2008, Varese signed him as a free agent, after Lucchese folded. He quickly became the first choice goalkeeper and won 2009 Lega Pro Seconda Divisione.
In the next season, Varese gained another advancement: the team ended at second place of Lega Pro Prima Divisione, as well as winning the promotion playoffs.

However, he was the understudy of Massimo Zappino in 2010–11 Serie B. The team finished fourth but failed to win the promotion playoffs. After the departure of Zappino in late August 2011, Moreau became first choice again in the first 4 rounds, win zero wins, 2 draws and 2 losses. Since round 5 Walter Bressan became the first choice.

He retired in 2013, aged 30, to move to Canada, the country his wife is originary from.

References

External links

aic.football.it

French footballers
French expatriate footballers
Inter Milan players
Spezia Calcio players
Ternana Calcio players
S.S.D. Lucchese 1905 players
S.S.D. Pro Sesto players
S.S.D. Varese Calcio players
Serie B players
Serie C players
Expatriate footballers in Italy
French expatriate sportspeople in Italy
France youth international footballers
Association football goalkeepers
Sportspeople from Quimper
1983 births
Living people
Footballers from Brittany